The Purnell equation is an equation used in analytical chemistry to calculate the resolution Rs between two peaks in a chromatogram. 

where
Rs is the resolution between the two peaks

N2 is the plate number of the second peak

α is the separation factor between the two peaks

k '2 is the retention factor of the second peak.

The higher the resolution, the better the separation.

References

Chromatography
Equations